Balina Guri (Kannada: ಬಾಳಿನ ಗುರಿ) is a 1979 Indian Kannada film, directed by K. S. Prakash Rao and produced by K. S. Prakash Rao. The film stars Jayanthi, Master Nataraj, J. K. Srinivasamurthy and Balakrishna in the lead roles. The film has musical score by K. Chakravarthy.

Cast

Jayanthi
Master Nataraj
J. K. Srinivasamurthy
Balakrishna
Vajramuni
Shivaram
Seetharam
Hanumathachar
Mysore Gururaj
Comedian Guggu
Gode Lakshminarayan
Pandari Bai
Ramadevi
Kalpana Shiroor
Vijayabhanu
Jayamalini
Yamunabai
Baby Rekha
Ravi Chakravarthy
Master Jayasimha
Master GKT Shashi
Master GKT Ravi
Master Vishwanath
Master Prakash
Master Shekar
Master Kumar
Master Aravind C. Desai

References

External links
 

1970s Kannada-language films
Films directed by K. S. Prakash Rao